The 1997 Australian Touring Car season was the 38th year of touring car racing in Australia since the first runnings of the Australian Touring Car Championship and the fore-runner of the present day Bathurst 1000, the Armstrong 500.

Two major touring car categories raced in Australia during 1997, V8 Supercar and Super Touring. Between them there were 26 touring car race meetings held during 1997; a ten-round series for V8 Supercars, the 1997 Australian Touring Car Championship (ATCC); an eight-round series for Super Touring, the 1997 Australian Super Touring Championship (ASTC); an unofficial four round series for V8 Supercars, the 1997 ARDC AMSCAR series (the final edition of AMSCAR); support programme events at the 1997 Australian Grand Prix and 1997 Sunbelt IndyCarnival and three stand alone long distance races, nicknamed 'enduros'.

Results and standings

Race calendar

The 1997 Australian touring car season consisted of 26 events.

Super Touring GT-P Race
This meeting was a support event of the 1997 Australian Grand Prix. The thin Super Touring field was bolstered by cars from the Australian GT-Production Car Championship (indicated in italics).

TAC V8 Supercar Showdown
This meeting was a support event of the 1997 Australian Grand Prix.

Australian Touring Car Championship

Hog's Breath V8 Supercar Challenge
This meeting was a support event of the 1997 Sunbelt IndyCarnival.

Australian Super Touring Championship

ARDC AMSCAR series

Tickford 500

AMP Bathurst 1000

Primus 1000 Classic

References

External links
 Official V8 Supercar site
 1997 Racing Results Archive

Australian Touring Car Championship
Supercar seasons
Touring Cars